Puya silvae-baccae is a species in the genus Puya. This species is endemic to Venezuela.

References

silvae-baccae
Flora of Venezuela